The Martin AN/GSG-5 Battery Integration and Radar DIsplay Equipment (BIRDIE) was a transportable electronic fire distribution center for automated command and control of remote surface-to-air missile launch batteries.  The solid state radar netting system replaced the vacuum tube AN/FSG-1 at 3 United States Missile Master bunkers (Fort Lawton Air Force Station, Washington; Fort Heath, Massachusetts; and Lockport Air Force Station, New York) and BIRDIEs were deployed at over 25 US locations including Homestead-Miami, Florida; Providence, Rhode Island; and San Francisco.  The AN/GSG-5 with 3 consoles was a direction center for up to 16 Nike missile batteries, but a smaller variant with only 1 console and without computer and storage equipment (single shelter AN/GSG-6) could control only 2 batteries and was the 1st BIRDIE deployed.  Several BIRDIE systems were replaced by Hughes AN/TSQ-51 Air Defense Command and Coordination Systems (Missile Mentor), and the last AADCP with an AN/GSG-5 was at Ft Lawton on July 1, 1973 (the next-to-last was at Highlands Air Force Station, New Jersey).

References

1961 establishments in the United States
1961 in science
1961 in military history
Radar networks
Cold War military computer systems of the United States
United States nuclear command and control